Matilde d'Este (February 7, 1729 – November 14, 1803) was a Modenese princess by birth. She was the daughter of Francesco III d'Este, Duke of Modena and Charlotte Aglaé d'Orléans.

Biography
Matilde was born in Genoa, the second daughter and fifth child of Francesco III d'Este, Duke of Modena, the sovereign Duke of Modena and his wife, Charlotte Aglaé d'Orléans, Mademoiselle de Valois — a granddaughter of Louis XIV of France and Madame de Montespan. Her mother separated from her father in the 1740s after an affair with the Duke of Richelieu was discovered at the Modenese court. Exiled to France, Charlotte Aglaé still managed to arrange the marriages of her daughters. Her eldest sister Maria Teresa married her second cousin, the Duke of Penthièvre. Her younger sister, Maria Fortunata also married a cousin of theirs, Louis François Joseph de Bourbon, heir to the Prince of Conti. However, all marriage negotiations for Matilde failed. 

After the death of her sister Maria Teresa in 1754, her mother tried to arrange a marriage between Matilde and her sister's widow. However, the grieving Duke declined the offer and never remarried. Matilde would also remain unmarried. She died in 1803 and was interred in the chapel of the Convent of the Visitation in Venice. Two of her siblings, Ercole III of Modena and Maria Fortunata, are also buried there.

Ancestry

References

External links
Picture of Charlotte as Duchess of Modena

1729 births
1803 deaths
18th-century Italian people
18th-century Italian women
House of Este
Modenese princesses
Daughters of monarchs